William  Alexander Gowdy (24 December 1903 – 16 March 1958) was a Northern Irish footballer who played for, among others, Hull City, Sheffield Wednesday, Gateshead, Hibernian and Aldershot. He gained six caps for Ireland between 1931 and 1936.

His elder brother Joe was also a footballer; he too gained six caps for Ireland, but they did not play together for their country (nor any clubs) – Joe's last cap was in 1927.

References

Association footballers from Northern Ireland
Pre-1950 IFA international footballers
Cliftonville F.C. players
Dundalk F.C. players
Ards F.C. players
Brantwood F.C. players
Hull City A.F.C. players
Sheffield Wednesday F.C. players
Gateshead A.F.C. players
Linfield F.C. players
Hibernian F.C. players
Goole Town F.C. players
Altrincham F.C. players
Aldershot F.C. players
League of Ireland players
English Football League players
Scottish Football League players
Association footballers from Belfast
NIFL Premiership players
1903 births
1958 deaths
Association football wing halves